Radicinin is a phytotoxin with the molecular formula C12H12O5. Radicinin is produced by the fungal plant pathogen Alternaria radicina and other Alternaria species.

References

Further reading 

 

Radicinin